Billy Millar (born 25 October 1906, date of death unknown) was a Northern Irish footballer who played as a striker.

References

External links
 LFC History profile

1906 births
Association footballers from Northern Ireland
Liverpool F.C. players
Year of death missing
Pre-1950 IFA international footballers
Sportspeople from Ballymena
Linfield F.C. players
Barrow A.F.C. players
Newport County A.F.C. players
Carlisle United F.C. players
Sligo Rovers F.C. players
Cork F.C. players
Drumcondra F.C. players
Association football forwards
English Football League players
Cork City F.C. (1938–1940) players
Lochgelly United F.C. players